Austrocidaria prionota is a species of moth in the family Geometridae. It is endemic to New Zealand. It is found in the South Island and is regarded as being uncommon.

Taxonomy 
This species was first described by Edward Meyrick in 1883 using specimens collected at Castle Hill and Dunedin and given the name Arsinoe prionota. Meyrick described the species in more detail in 1884. In 1886 Meyrick recognised that the genus name he had used for this species had been used previously and renamed the genus in which he placed this species as Anachloris. In 1917 Meyrick synonymised Anachloris with Hydriomena. George Hudson described and illustrated the species both in his 1898 book New Zealand Moths and Butterflies (Macro-lepidoptera) and in his 1928 book The Butterflies and Moths of New Zealand using the name Hydriomena prionota. In 1971 J. S. Dugdale placed this species within the genus Austrocidaria. Dugdale suggested that A. prionota may actually be the same species as Austrocidaria lithurgia.

The lectotype specimen is held at the Canterbury Museum.

Description 
Hudson described the species as follows: 

A. prionota is likely variable in appearance. This species has been confused with Austrocidaria cedrinodes as the two species are similar in appearance. However they can be easily distinguished from each other as A. prionota has a complete lack of antennal pectinations.

Distribution 
This species is endemic to New Zealand. This species occurs in the South Island and has been collected at Gouland Downs in the Kahurangi National Park, as well as at Castle Hill in Christchurch and in Dunedin.  It is regarded as not common and difficulty has been had sourcing specimens good enough for the addition of this species into a photographic database.

Biology and behaviour 
The larvae of A. prionota have been recorded feeding on Myrsine divaricata as well as on species of Coprosma.  This species is on wing in January and October.  The adult moth is regarded as being a medium flyer with the ability to remain active in light breezes. An adult moth is attracted to light and has been collected via Robinson light trapping.

References

External links 

 Image of lectotype specimen

Xanthorhoini
Moths of New Zealand
Moths described in 1883
Taxa named by Edward Meyrick
Endemic fauna of New Zealand
Endemic moths of New Zealand